Neoditrema ransonnetii is a species of surfperch native to the Pacific coasts of Korea and Japan. This species grows to a length of  FL. This species is the only known member of its genus. The specific name honours the Austrian diplomat, painter, lithographer, biologist and explorer Eugen von Ransonnet-Villez (1838–1926), who obtained the type specimens in Japan.

References

Embiotocidae
Fish of the Pacific Ocean
Taxa named by Franz Steindachner
Fish described in 1883